The 1991 AC Delco 500 was the 27th stock car race of the 1991 NASCAR Winston Cup Series and the 17th iteration of the event. The race was held on Sunday, October 20, 1991, before an audience of 57,700 in Rockingham, North Carolina, at North Carolina Speedway, a  permanent high-banked racetrack. The race took the scheduled 492 laps to complete. In the final laps of the race, Leo Jackson Motorsports driver Harry Gant would suffer a faulty final pit-stop on lap 452, leading towards Robert Yates Racing driver Davey Allison to take the lead for the final 17 laps of the race. The victory was Allison's 12th career NASCAR Winston Cup Series victory and his fourth victory of the season. To fill out the top three, the aforementioned Harry Gant and Roush Racing driver Mark Martin would finish second and third, respectively.

With a 19-point increase over competitor Ricky Rudd in the driver's championship standings, Dale Earnhardt was considered the heavy favorite to win the championship, having a 157-point lead over Rudd.

Background 

North Carolina Speedway was opened as a flat, one-mile oval on October 31, 1965. In 1969, the track was extensively reconfigured to a high-banked, D-shaped oval just over one mile in length. In 1997, North Carolina Motor Speedway merged with Penske Motorsports, and was renamed North Carolina Speedway. Shortly thereafter, the infield was reconfigured, and competition on the infield road course, mostly by the SCCA, was discontinued. Currently, the track is home to the Fast Track High Performance Driving School.

Entry list 

 (R) denotes rookie driver.

Qualifying 
Qualifying was split into two rounds. The first round was held on Thursday, October 17, at 2:30 PM EST. Each driver would have one lap to set a time. During the first round, the top 20 drivers in the round would be guaranteed a starting spot in the race. If a driver was not able to guarantee a spot in the first round, they had the option to scrub their time from the first round and try and run a faster lap time in a second round qualifying run, held on Friday, October 18, at 2:00 PM EST. As with the first round, each driver would have one lap to set a time. For this specific race, positions 21-40 would be decided on time, and depending on who needed it, a select amount of positions were given to cars who had not otherwise qualified but were high enough in owner's points; up to two were given.  If needed, a past champion who did not qualify on either time or provisionals could use a champion's provisional, adding one more spot to the field.

No drivers would fail to qualify.

Full qualifying results

Race results

Standings after the race 

Drivers' Championship standings

Note: Only the first 10 positions are included for the driver standings.

References 

1991 NASCAR Winston Cup Series
NASCAR races at Rockingham Speedway
October 1991 sports events in the United States
1991 in sports in North Carolina